The following outline traces the territorial evolution of the U.S. State of Wyoming.

Outline
Historical territorial claims of Spain in the present State of Wyoming:
Nueva Vizcaya, 1562–1821
Santa Fé de Nuevo Méjico, 1598–1821
Gran Cuenca, 1776–1821
Treaty of Córdoba of 1821
Historical territorial claims of France in the present State of Wyoming:
Louisiane, 1682–1764
Treaty of Fontainebleau of 1762
Historical territorial claims of Spain in the present State of Wyoming:
Luisiana, 1764–1803
Third Treaty of San Ildefonso of 1800
Historical territorial claims of France in the present State of Wyoming:
Louisiane, 1803
Vente de la Louisiane of 1803
Historical international territory in the present State of Wyoming:
Oregon Country, 1818–1846
Provisional Government of Oregon (extralegal), 1843–1849
Oregon Treaty of 1846
Historical territorial claims of Mexico in the present State of Wyoming:
Santa Fé de Nuevo México, 1821–1848
Gran Cuenca, 1821–1848
Treaty of Guadalupe Hidalgo of 1848
Historical territorial claims of the Republic of Texas in the present State of Wyoming:
Disputed strip north from the headwaters of the Arkansas River and the Rio Grande, 1836–1845
Texas Annexation of 1845
Historical political divisions of the United States in the present State of Wyoming:
Unorganized territory created by the Louisiana Purchase, 1803–1804
District of Louisiana, 1804–1805
Territory of Louisiana, 1805–1812
Territory of Missouri, 1812–1821
Adams-Onís Treaty of 1819
Unorganized territory previously the western portion of the Missouri Territory, 1821–1854
Disputed territory created by the Texas Annexation, 1845–1850
Compromise of 1850
Unorganized territory created by the Oregon Treaty, 1846–1848
Unorganized territory created by the Treaty of Guadalupe Hidalgo, 1848–1850
Territory of Oregon, 1848–1859
State of Deseret (extralegal), 1849–1850
Territory of Utah, 1850–1896
Territory of Nebraska, 1854–1867
Territory of Washington, 1853–1889
Territory of Jefferson (extralegal), 1859–1861
Territory of Dakota, 1861–1889
Territory of Idaho, 1863–1890
Territory of Wyoming, 1868-1890
State of Wyoming since 1890

See also
History of Wyoming
Timeline of Wyoming history
Native Americans in the United States
Territorial evolution of the United States
 Nueva España
 La Louisiane
 La Luisiana
 Louisiana Purchase
 District of Louisiana
 Louisiana Territory
 Missouri Territory
 Mexican Empire
 Republic of Texas
 Oregon Territory
 Utah Territory
 Washington Territory
 Nebraska Territory
 Dakota Territory
 Idaho Territory
 Wyoming Territory
 State of Wyoming

References

External links
State of Wyoming website
Wyoming State Historical Society

 
Wyoming
Wyoming
Wyoming
Wyoming
History of the Northwestern United States
History of the American West
Geography of Wyoming